Serhii Shevchenko, born August 4, 1960 in Kramatorsk, Ukrainian SSR, Soviet Union (modern-day Donetsk Oblast, Ukraine), is a Ukrainian writer, journalist and editor. Merited Journalist of Ukraine.

Biography
Shevchenko was born in the town of Kramatorsk, in Ukraine (at that time – the Ukrainian SSR of the Soviet Union). After finishing secondary school in 1977, he enrolled into the Taras Shevchenko National University of Kyiv. In 1982, Shevchenko graduated from the Journalism faculty of University as a journalist. From 1982 to 1985, he worked at the Bila Tserkva newspaper as a correspondent. Then he made a career in the Security Service of Ukraine (press-officer, editor, executive editor, head of research unit of the Institute of State Security Problems). Colonel, a veteran of military service.

2010–2012 – head of Department of the State Service of Ukraine on Drugs Control (activities – international relations, public consultation, interaction with the media). After 2012 creative and social activities, Kyiv.

Shevchenko works in the field of literature since the 2000s. He is the author of a number of books about the tragedy Solovki, Sandarmokh, and also numerous articles in the periodical press. August 2, 2012 he has been stopped from taking part in the Days of Remembrance for the Victims of the Terror in the Sandarmokh Clearing in Karelia. He was one of a delegation from Ukraine travelling to Sandarmokh for annually held memorial events which mark the anniversary of the unleashing of what is known as the Great Terror (1937—1938). It is not clear what the grounds are for refusing Serhiy Shevchenko entry to Russia.

Shevchenko is a member of the National Union of Journalists of Ukraine (1994), the National Writer's Union of Ukraine (2011), the National Union of Ukrainian ethnographers (2015).

Books
, 2006. 
″Golden Feather. Liudmyla Mekh″, 2012. 
, 2013. The author of this book has been nominated for the Shevchenko National Prize. 
Empire of Terror, 2021. 

Books written by Serhii Shevchenko and historian Dmytro Viedienieiev:
″Ukrainian Solovki″ (″Ukrains'ki Solovky″, 2001). 
″Dispelled myths. Historical essays and articles″ (2010).

Articles
 The Moloch of the Solovky terror, 2008.
 The secrets of Mt. Sekirnaia, 2007.
 Shot at Sandarmokh. [http://www.day.kiev.ua/uk/article/ukrayina-incognita/rozstrilyani-v-sandarmosi .
 [https://gazeta.dt.ua/HISTORY/rik-zhertv-velikogo-teroru-vshanuymo-pam-yat-represovanih-243654_.html 
 [http://gazeta.dt.ua/history/oleksa-vlizko-tayemnicya-strati-poeta-_.html .
 [http://gazeta.dt.ua/history/gro-vakar-im-ya-z-moroku-solovkiv-_.html .
 [http://gazeta.dt.ua/history/spisok-sandarmohu-ubiyenni-sini-i-pasinki-ukrayini-_.html .
 [http://gazeta.dt.ua/history/volodimir-udovenko-dvi-dati-rozstrilu-_.html .
 [http://gazeta.dt.ua/history/parshiva-vivcya-sered-katolickih-muchenikiv-_.html .
 [http://svitlytsia.crimea.ua/?section=article&artID=14028 .
 [http://gazeta.dt.ua/history/vsevolod-gancov-zhittya-pislya-svincevoyi-zlivi-_.html .
 [http://gazeta.dt.ua/history/mikola-narushevich-sche-odna-tayemnicya-ostannoyi-adresi-_.html .
 [http://gazeta.dt.ua/history/vipusknik-soloveckoyi-akademiyi-_.html .
 [http://www.day.kiev.ua/uk/article/ukrayina-incognita/bezzhalni-shchupalcya-imperiyi .
 [http://gazeta.dt.ua/history/mikola-narushevich-sche-odna-tayemnicya-ostannoyi-adresi-_.html .
 [http://www.radiosvoboda.org/content/article/24477305.html .
 [http://gazeta.dt.ua/SOCIETY/mikola_lyubinskiy_i_logika_chervonogo_teroru__nevidomi_storinki_ukrayinskogo_rozstrilyanogo_vidrodzh.html .
 [http://www.day.kiev.ua/uk/article/cuspilstvo/perestoroga .
 [http://www.day.kiev.ua/uk/article/ukrayina-incognita/iz-solovkiv-ne-povernuvsya .
 [http://www.day.kiev.ua/uk/article/istoriya-i-ya/les-kurbas-silu-naciyi-ne-mozhut-vbiti-niyaki-dekreti .
 [http://incognita.day.kiev.ua/kozaczkij-xrest-v-urochishhi-sandarmox.htm .
 [http://www.day.kiev.ua/uk/article/ukrayina-incognita/biografiya-gilyotini-ukrayini .

Awards
 Honorary title of Ukraine (Ukrainian: Почесне звання України) ″Merited Journalist of Ukraine″ (2007), the state award.
 Award Ivan Franko in information activities (2007, 2018), the award of the State Committee for Television and Radio Broadcasting of Ukraine and the National Union of Journalists of Ukraine.
 International Award Volodymyr Vynnychenko (2011), the award of the Ukrainian Cultural Foundation.
 Art Аward ″Kyiv″ (2014), the award of the Kiev City State Administration.
 Viacheslav Chornovil Prize for the best nonfiction in journalism (2014), the award of the State Committee for Television and Radio Broadcasting of Ukraine and the National Union of Journalists of Ukraine.
 Gold Medal of Ukrainian Journalism (2009), the award of the National Union of Journalists of Ukraine.

References

External links
Сайт ″Літературна Київщина″ Київської обласної організації НСПУ. Сергій Шевченко 
Автор книг о Соловках — лауреат премий Украины 
Serhii Shevchenko
Презентація книги Сергія Шевченка ″Соловецький реквієм″ 
 Книговидавничий проект "Толока Шевченків" 
 ″Соловецький реквієм″ — на здобуття Шевченківської премії! 
 Василь Овсієнко. Голос українських Соловків // Україна молода (№ 157, 23.10.2014) 
 Укрінформ. Блоги 

1960 births
Living people
People from Kramatorsk
Ukrainian journalists
Ukrainian writers
Ukrainian non-fiction writers
Writers from Kyiv
Laureates of the Honorary Diploma of the Verkhovna Rada of Ukraine